Kevin Grant Boroevich (born 4 October 1960) is a former New Zealand rugby union player of Māori and Croatian descent. His iwi is Te Rarawa, of the Far North. A prop, Boroevich represented King Country, Wellington and North Harbour at a provincial level, and was a member of the New Zealand national side, the All Blacks, between 1983 and 1988. He played 26 matches for the All Blacks including three internationals.

References

1960 births
Living people
Sportspeople from Te Kūiti
New Zealand rugby union players
New Zealand international rugby union players
Wellington rugby union players
North Harbour rugby union players
Rugby union props
Māori All Blacks players
King Country rugby union players
New Zealand people of Croatian descent
Massey University alumni
People educated at Te Kuiti High School
Rugby union players from Waikato